Lee Doherty (born 31 March 1963) is a Northern Irish former football player and coach.

Playing career
Born in Belfast, Doherty played as a midfielder for Linfield and Glenavon. He also earned two caps for the Northern Ireland national team.

Coaching career
He later worked as an assistant manager at Ballymena United, between 2011 and 2016.

Personal life
After retiring as a player he became an architect. He is married with two daughters.

References

1963 births
Living people
Association footballers from Northern Ireland
Northern Ireland international footballers
Linfield F.C. players
Glenavon F.C. players
NIFL Premiership players
Association football midfielders
Architects from Northern Ireland